Kosheh may refer to:
Kosheh, Egypt
Kosheh Massacres
Kosheh, Iran